Morgan Davies (born 27 November 2001) is an Australian film and television actor. He started his career as a child actor. Davies publicly came out as transgender in 2020.

Career
Davies made his film debut as child actor in the Australian film The Tree.

He played Madeline in Storm Boy alongside Geoffrey Rush and Jai Courtney.

He starred in the 2020 Australian television series The End as a trans teen in the process of gender transitioning.

Filmography

Awards
2010 AFI Young Actor Award (The Tree) – Nominated
2010 AFI Best Actress Award (The Tree) – Nominated
2011 Film Critics Circle of Australia Award – Best Supporting Actor – Female (The Tree) – Nominated
2012 Film Critics Circle of Australia Award – Best Performance by a Young Actor (The Hunter) – Nominated
2012 AACTA Award for Best Actress in a Supporting Role (The Hunter) – Nominated

Reception
The Calgary Herald praised his touching performance in The Tree while Julie Bertuccelli, the director or The Tree, praised his work, calling his terrific.

References

External links

2001 births
21st-century Australian male actors
Australian male child actors
Australian male film actors
Australian male television actors
Living people
Place of birth missing (living people)
Transgender male actors
Australian LGBT actors